Ramona (sometimes referred to as the Walnut Islands), is an unincorporated community in the eastern part of Los Angeles County in the U.S. state of California. This area is also known locally as "unincorporated Covina Hills", and "unincorporated Pomona", or simply "Covina Hills" and "Pomona". The population was 4,053 according to the 2000 census. 
A large portion of the campus of California State Polytechnic University, Pomona, also known as Cal Poly Pomona, lies within Ramona's boundaries, with the rest being located in the city of Pomona, which lies to the east. Ramona is also bordered by the cities of Covina and San Dimas to the north, Walnut to the south, and West Covina to the west.

History
The land in Ramona was historically used for agriculture.

Geography
Ramona has a total area of 3.61 square miles.

Demographics

2000
There were 4,053 people living in Ramona, according to the US Census. The population density was 1,122 inhabitants per square mile. The racial makeup of the area was 35.0% Asian, 32.3% White, 26.3% Latino, 3.0% African American, and 3.4% from other races. The average household size was 3.1. The age distribution was 15.4% 10 and under, 11.5% from 11 to 18, 18.5% from 19 to 34, 24.6% from 35 to 49, 15.9% from 50 to 64, and 14.1% 65 or older. The median age was 37 years. The median household income was $86,325. (in 2008 dollars)

Economy

Employers
There is no commercial land in Ramona, California. However, there are institutions in the area, such as Forest Lawn – Covina Hills, and a large portion of Cal Poly Pomona, that employ people.

Government and infrastructure

Education
The area is mostly served by the Covina-Valley Unified School District, with students attending schools in the southeastern corner of the district, such as South Hills High School.

References

 
Unincorporated communities in Los Angeles County, California
Unincorporated communities in California